General Erich Georg Sebastian Anton von Falkenhayn (11 September 1861 – 8 April 1922) was the second Chief of the German General Staff of the First World War from September 1914 until 29 August 1916. He was removed on 29 August 1916 after the failure at the Battle of Verdun, the opening of the Battle of the Somme, the Brusilov Offensive and the entry of Romania into the war on the Allied side undid his strategy to end the war before 1917. He was later given important field commands in Romania and Syria. His reputation as a war leader was attacked in Germany during and after the war, especially by the faction supporting Paul von Hindenburg. Falkenhayn held that Germany could not win the war by a decisive battle but would have to reach a compromise peace; his enemies said he lacked the resolve necessary to win a decisive victory. Falkenhayn's relations with the Chancellor Theobald von Bethmann Hollweg were troubled and undercut Falkenhayn's plans.

Early life
Falkenhayn was born in Burg Belchau, a village near Graudenz, now Białochowo in Poland, to Fedor von Falkenhayn (1814–1896) and Franziska von Falkenhayn, née von Rosenberg (1826–1888). His ancestors could be traced to 1504. His brother Arthur (1857–1929) became tutor of Crown Prince Wilhelm and another brother Eugen (1853–1934) became a Prussian General of Cavalry. His only sister Olga von Falkenhayn was the mother of Field Marshal Fedor von Bock.

Military career

Becoming a cadet at the age of 11, Falkenhayn joined the Army in 1880 as Second Lieutenant. He served as an infantry and staff officer. He was seen as a capable, deliberate officer with an open mind. Between 1896 and 1903 Falkenhayn took a leave of absence and served Qing-Dynasty China as a military consultant and helped to establish some Chinese sea ports. In 1889 he returned to German service in the new Kiautschou Bay Leased Territory in China, serving in a Seebataillon (Marine Battalion) until March 1899, when he became a Major in the Army. He saw action during the Boxer Rebellion as a general staff officer of Alfred von Waldersee and spent time in Manchuria and Korea.

Service in Asia made Falkenhayn to be a favourite of the Kaiser and he became one of the military instructors of Crown Prince Wilhelm of Prussia. After his service in Asia, the army posted him to Brunswick, Metz and Magdeburg as a battalion commander in the posted area. On 10 April 1906, Falkenhayn became a section chief of the German General Staff. In 1907, Falkenhayn became Chief of Staff of the XVI Corps. On 27 January 1911, Falkenhayn was appointed as the commander of the 4th Guards Regiment. Before becoming Prussian Minister of War, he was posted to the General Staff for a year as the Supply department head of the General Staff. Despite being a department head, Falkenhayn did not play a significant role on the General Staff.

Prussian Minister of War (1913–1915) 
On 8 July 1913 he became Prussian Minister of War succeeding Josias von Heeringen, who was considered to be inactive. During the Zabern Affair, Falkenhayn as Minister of War, was part of the conference to end the affair. Falkenhayn participated in the meeting on 5 July 1914 when Germany announced to Austria-Hungary its support for war. Like most German military leaders, he did not expect a great European war but he soon embraced the idea and joined others pushing for Kaiser Wilhelm II to declare war. Falkenhayn wanted early mobilisation since the Kaiser started to secure his palace; when the war began Falkenhayn viewed this with enthusiasm. He assured the Kaiser that the German Army was fully ready for the conflict. He told the chancellor, Theobald von Bethmann Hollweg, that "Even if we perish over this, it will still have been worth it".

Chief of Staff (1914–1916)
Falkenhayn was 53 years old, making him the youngest man to become chief of staff. Falkenhayn continued in office as minister of war for another five months. Falkenhayn recommended Adolf Wild von Hohenborn as the new war minister. The Kaiser agreed with his recommendation, making Hohenborn the next war minister. Falkenhayn moved OHL to Mézières, to put OHL at the centre of the right wing of the German armies in the west and ordered the southern armies to dig in, part of the beginning of trench warfare. The responsibility of Falkenhayn increased when the Kaiser failed to decide a grand strategy. Falkenhayn did not want diplomatic interference in the course of war. For the first few weeks, lack of success led to widespread criticism. Falkenhayn recognized the pending failure of the modified Schlieffen Plan and attempted to outflank the British and French in the Race to the Sea, a series of meeting engagements in northern France and Belgium, in which each side made reciprocal attempts to turn the other's flank, until they ran out of room to manoeuvre on the North Sea coast.

In November 1914, Falkenhayn acknowledged that Germany would not be able to gain a decisive victory. He advocated a mild peace with the Russian Empire to Bethmann Hollweg, the better to concentrate against the French and British. Neither Bethmann Hollweg nor the generals on the Eastern Front, such as Paul von Hindenburg, Erich Ludendorff or Max Hoffmann, supported the idea since they believed that negotiation with the Russian Empire was impossible. While Helmuth von Moltke the Younger and Hindenburg were highly critical of Falkenhayn and sought to have him dismissed, the Emperor continued to support him. Falkenhayn did not perceive the need to deploy troops on the Vistula. Falkenhayn favoured sending troops to East Prussia, where the Russians took advantage of the weakening 8th Army. A Breakthrough Army for an offensive down the Somme river valley, consisting of nine new divisions, was formed in the first quarter of 1915 but three divisions were not ready in time. The new army was transferred to the Eastern Front and was re-named the 11th Army. The new force had success during the Second Battle of the Masurian Lakes but creating more new divisions was difficult because of the shortage of junior officers and equipment.

Falkenhayn noticed that the scepticism of the Ministry of War to airships, made by Ferdinand von Zeppelin, was justified. He tried to use the airships and give a rapid development of the air force. Hohenborn was appointed minister of war. On 20 January 1915, Falkenhayn was promoted to General der Infanterie. As the chief of staff, Falkenhayn had many enemies because of his tactics but he had Franz Conrad von Hötzendorf, chief of staff of the Austro-Hungarian Army, as his uneasy ally. They differed on war aims; Hötzendorf wanting a war against Russia, Falkenhayn against France. Falkenhayn attempted to keep Italy out of the war but failed. Attacks on the Eastern front to support the Austrians, such as the Gorlice–Tarnów Offensive, caused the Russians to evacuate Russian Poland and then to retreat deeper into the Russian interior. On 8 September 1915, Falkenhayn signed a military convention with Franz Conrad von Hötzendorf, which called for an immediate attack on Serbia. In the fall of 1915, Falkenhayn launched an attack against Serbia. Thus late in the year the favourable situation gave Falkenhayn hope to achieving peace in the east.

Falkenhayn preferred to conduct an offensive strategy on the Western Front, while conducting a limited campaign in the east; he hoped that Russia could be persuaded to accept a separate peace. Hindenburg and Ludendorff opposed this policy and wanted the main offensive effort to be in the east. Falkenhayn tried to weaken the French and British with renewed attacks and unrestricted submarine warfare. According to Reinhard Scheer, Falkenhayn was an advocate of submarine warfare because countering Britain was an important war aim but this was opposed by Bethmann Hollweg. Falkenhayn conducted a battle of attrition, as claimed in his post-war memoirs, in the Battle of Verdun in early 1916. Falkenhayn argued to the Kaiser that the war would end by causing many casualties to the French Army using methods that limited German losses.

Falkenhayn hoped that the French would fight for Verdun, the gateway to France from the east. Verdun offered the Germans the advantages of their artillery firing from three sides into a large salient within the German lines, excellent German communications and Verdun being bisected by the Meuse, which made it difficult for the French to defend. He ordered the Crown Prince to feint in Verdun and annihilate French Army, which would try to defend the city by sending more troops. Falkenhayn's strategy backfired, the Crown Prince and his chief of staff, Konstantin Schmidt von Knobelsdorf disobeyed the order and tried to seize the city. French artillery on the west back of the Meuse began to inflict many casualties on the 5th Army. Because more than a quarter of a million soldiers during the battle eventually died, Falkenhayn was sometimes called "the Blood-Miller of Verdun".

Contrary to Falkenhayn's expectations, the French were able to limit casualties in the divisions sent to Verdun, General Philippe Pétain kept the divisions in front of Verdun until casualties reached 50 per cent of the infantry and then relieved them. The procession of divisions back and forth was analogous to the operation of a "noria", a type of water-wheel that continuously lifts water and empties it into a trough. On 27 August 1916 Falkenhayn received news that the Kingdom of Romania had declared war on Austria-Hungary. After the relative failure at Verdun, coupled with reverses on the Eastern Front (the Brusilov Offensive and the entry of Romania into the war), the beginning of the Anglo-French offensive on the Somme and the intrigues of Hindenburg and Ludendorff, Falkenhayn was replaced as chief of staff by Hindenburg on 29 August 1916.

Romania (1916–1917)

Falkenhayn then assumed command of the 9th Army in Transylvania (6 September 1916) and in August launched a joint offensive against Romania with August von Mackensen who attacked from Bulgaria, through the Dobruja. As the commander of the 9th Army, Falkenhayn settled his army in Brașov and deceived the Romanians into believing that there would be no offensives in western Romania. The 9th Army fought the Romanian First Army in Hațeg. After the battle, Falkenhayn joined with Austrian forces to surround the Romanian forces. Falkenhayn delayed the offensive against Romanian forces and as a result came into conflict with Archduke Karl of Austria, who would later become the Charles I of Austria. He justified the postponement by pointing to the bad conditions of roads. Even with the conflict with the Austrian Army, in late 1916 and early 1917, Falkenhayn and Mackensen were able to drive the Romanian forces into Russia.

Palestine (1917–1918)

Following his success in Romania in Brașov during mid-July 1917, Falkenhayn went to take military command of the Ottoman Yildirim Army Group ( [Army Group F]), which was being formed in Mesopotamia and at Aleppo. In the Sinai and Palestine Campaign, Falkenhayn failed to prevent the conquest of Jerusalem by the British Egyptian Expeditionary Force (General Edmund Allenby) in December 1917 and was replaced by Otto Liman von Sanders. Falkenhayn is credited with avoiding a battle for the Old City of Jerusalem with its many holy sites, as well as with a crucial role in stopping the forced removal of the Jewish population of Palestine, which Governor Djemal Pasha had planned along the lines of the Armenian genocide. The evacuation of the population of Jerusalem during the harsh winter months had also been planned by Djemal Pasha and was thwarted by German officers including Falkenhayn.

Belarus (1918–1919)
In February 1918, Falkenhayn became commander of the 10th Army in Belarus. The unit carried out the occupation tasks in Belarus after Treaty of Brest-Litovsk. As an Army unit commander, he witnessed the end of the war in Belarus. In December 1918 he oversaw the withdrawal of the 10th Army to Germany. The formation disbanded in February 1919 and Falkenhayn retired from the army following the dissolution of his unit.

Retirement
In 1919, Falkenhayn retired from the army and withdrew to his estate, where he wrote his autobiography and several books on war and strategy. His war memoirs were translated into English as The German General staff and Its Critical Decisions, 1914–1916 (1919). With the benefit of hindsight, he remarked that the German declarations of war on Russia and France in 1914 were "justifiable but overly-hasty and unnecessary". Falkenhayn died in 1922, at Schloss Lindstedt, near Potsdam and was buried in Potsdam.

Family life

In 1886 Falkenhayn married Ida Selkmann, with whom he had a son Fritz Georg Adalbert von Falkenhayn (1890–1973) and a daughter Erika Karola Olga von Falkenhayn (1904–1975) who married Henning von Tresckow (1901–1944), a general who participated in the 20 July plot to assassinate Hitler.

Assessment
Falkenhayn in many ways typified the Prussian generals; a militarist in the literal sense, he had undeniable political and military competence and showed contempt for democracy and the representative Reichstag. He addressed the Reichstag in 1914, saying, "Only through the fact that the Prussian army is removed by the constitution from the party struggle and the influence of ambitious party leaders has it become what it is: the secure defence of peace at home and abroad."

Militarily, Falkenhayn had a mixed record. His offensive at Verdun proved a strategic failure. During the campaign against Romania in 1916 Falkenhayn demonstrated considerable skill in command of the German 9th Army, driving the Romanians from Transylvania, breaking through the Southern Carpathians and forcing the shattered Romanian forces north-east into Moldavia.

Winston Churchill considered him to be the ablest of the German generals in World War I. Dupuy also ranked him near the top of the German commanders, just below Hindenburg and Ludendorff. Foley wrote that Germany's enemies were far more able to apply a strategy of attrition, because they had greater amounts of manpower, industry and economic control over the world, resorting to many of the methods used by Falkenhayn in Russia in 1915 and France in 1916. As the cost of fighting the war increased, the war aims of the Entente expanded, to include the overthrow of the political elites of the Central Powers and the ability to dictate peace to a comprehensively defeated enemy, which was achieved by a strategy of attrition.

During his term as the Chief of the General Staff, one staff officer wrote that Falkenhayn had lacked decisiveness and foresight in the matters of organization and tactics.

All sources portray Falkenhayn as a loyal, honest and punctilious friend and superior. His positive legacy is his conduct during the war in Palestine in 1917. As his biographer Holger Afflerbach wrote, "An inhuman excess against the Jews in Palestine was prevented only by Falkenhayn's conduct, which against the background of the German history of the 20th century has a special meaning, and one that distinguishes Falkenhayn."

Honours
He received the following decorations and awards:

See also
 Douaumont Ossuary Verdun

Footnotes

References

Further reading

External links

 

1861 births
1922 deaths
People from Grudziądz County
German male non-fiction writers
People from the Province of Prussia
German military personnel of the Boxer Rebellion
German Army generals of World War I
German military writers
German untitled nobility
Generals of Infantry (Prussia)
Prussian politicians
Field marshals of the Ottoman Empire
Grand Crosses of the Military Order of Max Joseph
Recipients of the Pour le Mérite (military class)
Grand Crosses of the Military Merit Order (Bavaria)
Recipients of the Iron Cross (1914), 1st class
Grand Crosses of the Order of Saint Stephen of Hungary
Recipients of the Order of the Rising Sun, 4th class
Recipients of the Order of the Sacred Treasure, 2nd class